The Pan-African University (or Pan African University) (PAU) is a post-graduate training and research network of university nodes in five regions, supported by the African Union and the Association of African Universities.

Formation

The first African Ministerial Conference on Science and Technology was held in 2003 in Johannesburg, South Africa with the aim of improving the quality of science and technology education and thereby the productivity of African economies. These ideas were elaborated in a "concept note" which outlined the objectives of the PAU. In 2008 the African Union agreed that the PAU should be established.A high-level panel was appointed in 2009 to oversee the PAU. The PAU was officially launched in 2011, and the university's statute was adopted in 2013. 
 
The PAU high-level panel included Njabulo Ndebele, author and former vice-chancellor of the University of Cape Town in South Africa, and Ahmadou Lamine Ndiaye, president of the Senegal Academy of Science and Technology. An interim Rectorate took over the high-level panel, headed by Deputy Rector Professor Kassa Belay of Ethiopia. A steering committee of stakeholders including representatives of the African Union Commission, eminent African academics, Africans in the Diaspora, partners, and the public and private sector performed the role of a Council until the establishment of the PAU Council in June 2015.

Objectives

The PAU aims to provide the opportunity for advanced graduate training and postgraduate research to high-performing African students. Objectives also include promoting mobility of students and teachers and harmonizing programs and degrees. According to Kenyan Education Minister Sam Ongeri the PAU will stimulate collaborative and internationally competitive research, and enhance the attractiveness of African higher education and research institutions.

Regional Institutes

The Pan African University addresses five crucial thematic areas, through a network of five flagship institutes, namely Basic Sciences, Technology and Innovation; Life and Earth Sciences (including Health and Agriculture), Governance, Humanities, and Social Sciences; Water and Energy Sciences (including Climate Change); and Space Sciences. The thematic areas are assigned to institutes hosted by existing Universities of excellence across Africa's five geographic regions as follows:
	The Institute for Basic Sciences, Technology, and Innovation (PAUSTI), hosted by the Jomo Kenyatta University of Agriculture and Technology in Kenya (Eastern Africa);
	The Institute for Life and Earth Sciences (including Health and Agriculture (PAULESI), hosted by the University of Ibadan in Nigeria (Western Africa);
	The Institute for Governance, Humanities and Social Sciences (PAUGHSS), hosted by the University of Yaounde II in Cameroon (Central Africa);
	The Institute for Water and Energy Sciences (including Climate Change (PAUWES), hosted by the University of Tlemcen in Algeria (Northern Africa); and
	The Institute for Space Sciences (PAUSS) is to be hosted by a university in the Republic of South Africa (Southern Africa).  
When fully deployed, each PAU thematic institute will be linked to ten Satellite Centers with complementary thematic specializations, inter-and trans-disciplinary programs. At full operational capacity, the PAU will incorporate 50 centers of excellence under its five academic hubs across Africa.

Implementation status
PAU Institutes are currently operational in four of Africa's five regions (Western, Eastern, Central and Northern regions), whilst negotiations are ongoing to operationalize the fifth PAU Institute in Southern Africa. The first batch of 55 students graduated in Kenya in November 2014, and another batch graduated in November 2015 from the Life and Earth Sciences Institute in Nigeria. PAU has an existing student population of 314 with a new admissions list of 350 for the 2015/2016 academic year. The call for student applications for the 2015–2016 academic year attracted 5629 applicants, representing an overall increment of 361% from the previous year. The number of female applicants increased by 560.3 percent, and the proportion of female applicants increased across institutes.

The January 2015 Summit of Heads of State and Government also appointed Tolly Mbwette (Tanzania) as the President and Paulo Horácio de Sequeira e Carvalho (Angola) as the Vice President of the PAU Council for a three-year term, based on regional nominations. The Commission proceeded to constitute the broader membership of the Council in line with provisions of the PAU Statute, and the PAU Council held its inaugural meeting on 25 June 2015 at the AUC Headquarters in Addis Ababa. The Council held its first meeting in June and an extraordinary meeting in October 2015. At both meetings, priority matters bordering on the project's progress and development were discussed, including the need to amend the PAU Statute to confer greater autonomy upon the university.

The January 2015 Summit also selected the Republic of Cameroon to host the Pan African University Rectorate, following evaluation missions to the countries that applied to host the Rectorate including Benin, Cameroon, Ethiopia, and Tunisia. Consultative communication has been ongoing between the Commission and the Government of Cameroon resulting in the adoption of a roadmap for the final relocation of the Rectorate to Yaoundé by the end of March 2016.

PAU scholarship grants
PAU offers full scholarships to all students enrolled in its programs following a competitive admissions process. Calls for scholarship applications are issued and widely disseminated by the Rectorate and students apply online.PAU Institutes establish juries of local, regional, and international experts to select students and Institute Boards submit the final list of selected students to the Rectorate. The PAU Senate makes final recommendations on student admission to the PAU Council. Before enrolment, each student signs a scholarship agreement specifying the conditions of the offer and the duties and responsibilities of both parties. In the scholarship agreement, PAU Students are required to make an undertaking to serve any African Union Member State for a period equal to at least the duration of the scholarship after the successful completion of their studies. Students are obliged not to engage in any income-generating activities that will interfere with their academic programs. Student engagement in income-generating activities shall be approved by the PAU Rectorate, only if such activities will not interfere with the student's academic program. The scholarship grant covers the following costs:
	Tuition fees are paid directly to the relevant PAU institute;
	A stipend of $588 per month for Masters, and $823 for Ph.D. students, to support the student's living costs including food, housing, utilities, local transportation, and medical insurance;
	Students not permanently resident in the country hosting the institute they are attending are entitled to a single, economy return air ticket for the most direct route between their country/city of permanent residence and the host country/city; and
	Students permanently resident in the country hosting the institute they are attending are entitled to $100 to cover the cost of their travel.
The PAU Rectorate reserves the right to terminate or suspend the grant if there is compelling evidence that the student has not complied with any of the provisions of the scholarship agreement.

PAU Partnerships
PAU Thematic Partners are responsible for strengthening the teaching and research capacity of the Institutes and Centers through the acquisition of world-class equipment and facilities as well as the incorporation of best practices and standards. Thematic Partners are also expected to make financial and technical contributions towards the running of PAU Institutes. Among PAU Partners, those supporting more than one thematic area are designated Key Thematic Partners (KTPs).

Pan African University Alumni Association 
The General Assembly of the PAUAA held at The African Union Commission Headquarters in Addis Ababa, Ethiopia from 12 to 13 December 2017 ended with the official inauguration of the Pan African University Alumni Association and assumption of office by the Inaugural members of the Bureau.

Pursuant to the resolution of the Pan African University (PAU) Senate adopted at its inaugural meeting from 3–4 May 2014 (PAU/SM/R/01/2017), there was the need to establish The Pan African University Alumni Association (Abbreviated as PAUAA). A cross-section of PAU graduates (5 from each Institute) was invited by The African Union Commission (AUC) and PAU to participate in the establishment of, and attend the first General Assembly of the PAUAA from 12 – 13 December 2017.

The Inaugural Bureau is composed of the following: President – HE Valentine Oshotse Eleta (PAULESI, West Africa), Vice President – HE Rehema Khimulu (PAUWES, East Africa), Treasurer – Nathalie Mawo Suliy (PAUSTI, Central Africa), Secretary-General – Gavamukulya Yahaya (PAUSTI, East Africa), Assistant Secretary-General – Nabil Khorchani (PAUWES, Northern Africa), Finance Secretary – Isaac Kodzo Amegbor (PAULESI, West Africa), Communications Officer – Katia Gilda Rafael Bernardo (PAUGHSS, Southern Africa), Public Relations Officer – Sakah Bernard (PAUGHSS, Central Africa), and Internal Auditor – MitschelleAkoth Onyango (PAULESI, East Africa).

References

Europe-Africa centers

Educational institutions established in 2008